Multani Khussa or simply Khussa, 
is a style of Punjabi handcrafted footwear produced in Multan, Punjab, Pakistan. Khussa are made by artisans mostly using vegetable-tanned leather. The uppers are made of one piece of leather or textile embroidered and embellished with brass nails, cowry shells, mirrors, bells and ceramic beads. Even the bonding from the upper to the sole is done by cotton thread that is not only eco-friendly but also enmeshes the leather fibers with great strength. Some product range also uses bright and ornate threads.

See also
 Jutti
 Mojari
 Paduka

References 

Folk footwear
Pakistani footwear
Mughal art